The Asia/Oceania Zone was one of the three zones of the regional Davis Cup competition in 1997.

In the Asia/Oceania Zone there were four different tiers, called groups, in which teams competed against each other to advance to the upper tier.

Group I

Winners in Group I advanced to the World Group Qualifying Round, along with losing teams from the World Group first round. Teams who lost their respective ties competed in the relegation play-offs, with winning teams remaining in Group I, whereas teams who lost their play-offs were relegated to the Asia/Oceania Zone Group II in 1998.

Participating nations

Group II

Winners in Group II advanced to the Asia/Oceania Zone Group I. Teams who lost their respective ties competed in the relegation play-offs, with winning teams remaining in Group II, whereas teams who lost their play-offs were relegated to the Asia/Oceania Zone Group III in 1998.

Participating nations

Group III

The top two teams in Group III advanced to the Asia/Oceania Zone Group II in 1998, whereas the bottom two teams were relegated to the Asia/Oceania Zone Group IV in 1998.

Participating nations

Group IV

The top two teams in Group IV advanced to the Asia/Oceania Zone Group III in 1998. All other teams remained in Group IV.

Participating nations

References

External links
Davis Cup official website

 
Davis Cup Asia/Oceania Zone
Asia Oceania Zone